The Billboard Latin Music Award for Latin Rhythm Album of the Year is an honor that is presented annually at the Billboard Latin Music Awards, a ceremony which honors "the most popular albums, songs, and performers in Latin music, as determined by the actual sales, radio airplay, streaming and social data that shapes Billboard's weekly charts."

The accolade for Latin Rhythm Album of the Year was first presented at the fifteenth Billboard Latin Music Awards in 2009 to Panamanian singer Flex's Te Quiero (2008). The album, along with the title track gained Flex thirteen nominations at the ceremony, where the album also received a nomination for Latin Album of the Year, Latin Album of the Year in the male category and Latin Album of the Year in the new artist category. It led the Billboard Latin Rhythm Albums chart for sixteen weeks in 2008. Puerto Rican duo Wisin & Yandel are the most awarded act with three wins, while Puerto Rican singer Don Omar has the most nominations with six. Puerto Rico is the most awarded nationality, receiving six wins. Panama and the United States are the only other awarded nationalities.

Recipients

List of winners and nominees

See also
Latin Grammy Award for Best Urban Music Album
Lo Nuestro Award for Urban Album of the Year

Notes 
 Each year is linked to the article about the Billboard Latin Music Awards held that year.
 The nationality of the performing artist(s).
 The name of the performer(s) and the nominated song

References

Rhythm Album of the Year
Awards established in 2009
Album awards